The HC Lions Courmaosta were an ice hockey team in Courmayeur, Italy. The club was founded in 1933. They played in the Serie A, the top level of ice hockey in Italy. The club folded in 1999.

Achievements
Coppa Italia champion: 1998

Courmayeur
Lions
 
1933 establishments in Italy
Sport in Aosta Valley
Courmayeur
Ice hockey clubs disestablished in 1999
1999 disestablishments in Italy